The 2017 Rugby Europe Sevens Trophy is the second division of Rugby Europe's 2017 sevens season. This edition was hosted by the cities of Ostrava and Bucharest from 3–18 June, with the winner promoted to the 2018 Grand Prix and the two teams with the fewest points relegated to Conference 1.

Schedule

Trophy Standings

Ostrava

Pool Stage

Pool A

Pool B

Pool C

Knockout stage
Challenge Trophy

5th Place

Cup
{{Round8-with third

|4 June 2017 – 10:00 – Ostrava
||26||12
|4 June 2017 – 11:06 – Ostrava
||0||12
|4 June 2017 – 10:22 – Ostrava
||19||12
|4 June 2017 – 10:44 – Ostrava
||24||7

|4 June 2017 – 13:59 – Ostrava
||5||31
|4 June 2017 – 14:21 –Ostrava
||0||35|4 June 2017 – 17:14 – Ostrava
||5||14|4 June 2017 – 16:52 – Ostrava
||14||10
}}

Bucharest

Pool Stage

Pool A

Pool B

Pool C

Knockout stageChallenge Trophy5th PlaceCup'''

References

Trophy
2017 rugby sevens competitions
2017 in Czech sport
2017 in Romanian sport